Service is the seventh studio album by Yellow Magic Orchestra. The band dissolved the following year after a world tour, but would later reform in 1993 for a one-off reunion album, Technodon. Like ×∞Multiplies, it contains a mixture of YMO songs and comedy sketches performed by Super Eccentric Theater, or S.E.T. The first Dutch/German edition of the album omitted the sketches, effectively cutting the album's length in half. In 1999, the album was remastered under Hosono's supervision with new liner notes provided by lyricist Peter Barakan.

Service features "You've Got to Help Yourself", which was previously featured in instrumental form on the previous album, Naughty Boys Instrumental. The 2nd "S.E.T." track featured a sample of Casiopea's song "Time Limit". "以心電信" more accurately transliterates to "Telegraph from the heart".

Track listing

Personnel 
Yellow Magic Orchestra – arrangements, electronics, mixing engineers, producers
Haruomi Hosono – bass guitar, synth bass, keyboards, vocals
Ryuichi Sakamoto – keyboards, vocals
Yukihiro Takahashi – vocals, electronic drums, cymbals, keyboards

Guest musicians
Takeshii Fujii and Akihiko Yamazoe – technical assistance
Peter Barakan – lyrics

Super Eccentric Theater
Yūji Miyake, Hisahiro Ogura, Osamu Hagihashi, Daisuke Yamazaki, Kōichi Nagata, Etsuyo Mitani, Keiko Ishii & Akemi Imamura – counterparts

Staff
Mitsuo Koike – recording and mixing engineer
Akitsugu Doi – assistant engineer
Teppei Kasai (CBS/Sony Shinanomachi Studio) – mastering engineer
Tsuguya Inoue – art director, painting
Beans – design

References 

1983 albums
Yellow Magic Orchestra albums
Alfa Records albums
Musique concrète albums